St. Clair Township, Ohio may refer to:

St. Clair Township, Butler County, Ohio
St. Clair Township, Columbiana County, Ohio

Ohio township disambiguation pages